Charles Edwin Bassett (February 9, 1863 in Central Falls, Rhode Island – May 28, 1942 in Pawtucket, Rhode Island), was a Major League Baseball infielder. He played all or part of nine seasons in the majors, from -, for the Providence Grays, Kansas City Cowboys, Indianapolis Hoosiers, New York Giants, and Louisville Colonels.

External links

1863 births
1942 deaths
Major League Baseball infielders
Baseball players from Rhode Island
Providence Grays players
Kansas City Cowboys (NL) players
Indianapolis Hoosiers (NL) players
Louisville Colonels players
New York Giants (NL) players
19th-century baseball players
Providence Clamdiggers (baseball) players
Providence Grays (minor league) players